Jens Sønderup was a Danish politician who served as Minister of Agriculture of Denmark.

References

20th-century Danish politicians